Brusly High School (BHS) is a high school (grades 9–12) in Brusly, Louisiana, United States. It is a part of the West Baton Rouge Parish School Board.

The school serves residents of Brusly, Addis, and unincorporated areas in southern parts of the parish.  the school has over 600 students.

Athletics
Brusly High athletics competes in the LHSAA.

References

External links
 Brusly High School
 

Schools in West Baton Rouge Parish, Louisiana
Public high schools in Louisiana